United Campaign Against Plastic Bullets is an organisation based in Belfast, Northern Ireland that opposes the use of plastic bullets by the British army and the Northern Ireland police.

Following the death of John Downes, killed by a plastic bullet fired by members of the Royal Ulster Constabulary in August 1984, the campaign was founded by Clara Reilly and Emma Groves (1920–2007),who had been blinded  by a rubber bullet in 1971.  After John Downes, two more youths were killed by plastic bullets: Keith White, a 22-year-old from Portadown, in 1986 and Seamus Duffy, aged 15, from Belfast, in 1989.

In March 2005, the Northern Ireland Policing Board agreed to substitute the last variant of the plastic bullet, the L21, for the less-lethal Attenuated Energy Projectile (AEP).  The deployment of the AEP is monitored by the Northern Ireland Police Ombudsman.

See also
 Eye injuries in the 2019–2020 Chilean protests
 Relatives for Justice

References

External links
BBC News, Thursday, 2 August 2001, 12:35 GMT 13:35 UK - The trouble with plastic bullets
BBC News, Friday, 1 June 2001, 21:38 GMT 22:38 UK - NI plastic bullet records 'inadequate'
Irish Democrat, 2002 -  Army called upon to disclose plastic-bullet guidelines
Relatives of people killed by plastic bullets call on Human Rights Commission to "go the extra mile" 
Northern Ireland Peace Act (Introduced in the United States House of Representatives 13 March 1997, but not passed) Sponsored by Donald M. Payne. Proposed U.S. legislation from 1997 would have banned the export of plastic bullets to the United Kingdom, and included the following "finding": "The United Campaign Against Plastic Bullets claim that the use of plastic bullets has caused further alienation of nationalists and increased distrust of the security forces of the United Kingdom while contributing to the destabilization of Northern Ireland."
An Phoblacht, Thursday, 23 May 2002 - Plastic Bullet outrage
Belfast Telegraph, Friday, 17 September 2004  - Campaign urges ban on plastic bullets- Relatives remember 1982 Derry tragedy.

Political organisations based in Northern Ireland
Organizations established in 1984
The Troubles (Northern Ireland)
1984 establishments in Northern Ireland
Baton rounds
Eye injury